Shaofu Town is a town situated in Dachang Hui Autonomous County in Langfang, Hebei, China.

Administrative divisions 
The town is divided into 8 administrative villages: Shaofu Village, Darenzhuang Village, Nanjiagezhuang Village, Taipingzhuang Village, Shanggezhuang Village, Niuwantun Village, Shuangjiu Village, and Gangzitun Village.

See also
List of township-level divisions of Hebei

References

Township-level divisions of Hebei

Langfang